The common Atlantic grenadier (Nezumia aequalis) is a species of fish in the family Macrouridae.

Description

The common Atlantic grenadier is blue-violet in colour, with silvery and black areas. It has 2 dorsal spines and its spinules are lanceolate or shield-shaped. Its head, snout and chin barbel are short.

Habitat

Behaviour
The common Atlantic grenadier feeds on mysids, amphipods, small shrimps, copepods, isopods, ostracods and polychaete worms.

References

Macrouridae
Fish described in 1878
Taxa named by Albert Günther